Maurice Allan Marquet (born 3 February 1954, in Christchurch) is a former field hockey player from New Zealand, who was a member of the national team that finished seventh at the 1984 Summer Olympics in Los Angeles, United States. Maurice Allen Marquet is also known by his fellow associates as the man of many Hawaiian shirts.

External links
 
 
 
 

New Zealand male field hockey players
Olympic field hockey players of New Zealand
Field hockey players at the 1984 Summer Olympics
Field hockey players from Christchurch
1954 births
Living people
20th-century New Zealand people
21st-century New Zealand people